Jordyn Marie Wieber (born July 12, 1995) is an American former artistic gymnast turned gymnastics coach. Since April 2019, she has been the head coach of the Arkansas Razorbacks gymnastics team.

Wieber was a member of the gold medal-winning U.S. Women's Gymnastics team, self-dubbed the "Fierce Five", at the 2012 Summer Olympics. She was also a member of the gold-winning American team at the 2011 World Championships, where she also won the individual all-around title and was the bronze medalist on the balance beam.

Early life 
Wieber was born on July 12, 1995, in DeWitt, Michigan, the daughter of Rita (née Reifsnyder) Wieber, who is an emergency room nurse and exercise physiologist, and David Wieber, who is a director at a health-care subsidiary. She is the third oldest of four children, and her family attends the St. Jude Catholic Church in DeWitt. Her maternal grandmother is of Lebanese descent.

Wieber started gymnastics at a young age. "I was probably two or three. My parents noticed that I had unusually bigger muscles than a typical little kid, so they put me in gymnastics. A little fun class where I could run around and play and stuff and just have fun. Then I actually stopped for a little bit to do dance class. When I was four I went back [to gymnastics] and that's kind of when I started getting really into it." She later enrolled with John Geddert, who handpicked her to his Silverstars program, and by age 10, she had qualified for Level 10 in the Junior Olympic program, and then qualified for international elite a year later in 2006.

Gymnastics career

Junior

2006–2008
Wieber rose to the Junior International Elite level in 2006, at age 11, where she placed ninth in the all-around at the 2006 National Championships.  She was named to the US national team for the first time.

In 2007 Wieber competed at the U.S. Classic where she placed fifth in the all-around but won silver on balance beam and vault.  At the 2007 National Championships Wieber won bronze in the all-around behind Rebecca Bross and Samantha Shapiro. Wieber was later named to the team to compete at the 2007 Junior Pan American Championships alongside Olivia Courtney, Mattie Larson, and Chelsea Davis.  While there, Wieber helped the team win gold and individually she won silver in the all-around, behind Larson, gold on uneven bars and balance beam, and bronze on floor exercise.

In March 2008 Wieber was named to the team to compete at a USA-Canada-Italy-Netherlands Friendly Competition (now named the City of Jesolo Trophy).  While there she helped the team win gold and individually won gold in the all-around.  Wieber was named to the team to compete at the 2008 Pacific Rim Championships but had to withdraw due to injury. In June, Wieber won her first national championships.  She also placed first on vault and floor exercise, second on balance beam, and third on uneven bars.

2009–2010 
In February 2009, Wieber competed at the American Cup in Chicago, Illinois. She won the all-around competition with a score of 60.200, beating 2008 Olympian Bridget Sloan.  She was only 13 years old when she won the event, making her the second youngest American Cup champion after Tracee Talavera, who won in 1980.

Later that year in March Wieber competed at International Gymnix where she helped the team win gold and individually she placed first in the all-around and on all four apparatuses. In August, an injury prevented her from attending the Visa Championships.

In April 2010, was named to the team to compete at the 2010 Pacific Rim Gymnastics Championships in Melbourne, Australia alongside seniors Aly Raisman, Rebecca Bross, and Bridget Sloan and fellow juniors Kyla Ross and Sabrina Vega.  While there she helped the American team place first. Individually, she won the all-around competition with a score of 59.550, finishing ahead of Ross, Vega, and Russian Anna Rodionova.  She also won gold on the uneven bars and floor exercise and won silver on vault behind future Olympic teammate Kyla Ross.  She placed fourth on the balance beam.

In July of that year, Wieber competed at the Covergirl Classic in Chicago, Illinois. She won the all-around competition with a score of 59.950.  She also won gold on vault and uneven bars, silver on floor exercise behind Katelyn Ohashi, and placed sixth on balance beam. In August, Wieber attended the National Championships but sprained her ankle on the balance beam and withdrew from competition.  Even though she was unable to finish the competition, she was still named to the junior national team.

Senior

2011 
In March, Wieber participated in her first senior elite competition at the American Cup in Jacksonville, Florida, where she filled in for an injured athlete. She won the all-around competition with a score of 59.899. "It felt great to win my second American Cup title," Wieber said. "It's such an honor."

Later in March, Wieber competed at the City of Jesolo Trophy in Jesolo, Italy. She placed second behind teammate McKayla Maroney in the all-around competition with a score of 57.700. The Americans also won the team title.

In July, Wieber competed at the Covergirl Classic in Chicago, Illinois. She placed first on uneven bars with a score of 15.200 and tied for first on balance beam with Olympic medalist Alicia Sacramone. Both girls scored 15.200.

In August, Wieber competed at the Visa Championships in Saint Paul, Minnesota. After the first day, she said, "I wasn't too nervous, but I just had to get a few jitters out. I definitely think floor and vault were really strong. I'm definitely going to focus on bars and beam on Saturday." She won the all-around competition with a two-day combined score of 121.300. In the event finals, she placed first on uneven bars scoring 29.750, third on balance beam scoring 29.900 and first on floor scoring 29.900. Wieber said, "It feels really good. Just how aggressive and confident I was, I want to put into my training."

In October, Wieber competed at the 2011 World Artistic Gymnastics Championships in Tokyo, Japan. She contributed an all-around score of 60.398 towards the American team's first-place finish. She also won the all-around final with a score of 59.382. "I feel amazing," Wieber said. "I was so surprised. I wasn't expecting to come out on top but I am really happy and glad that I did enough on that floor routine to make it. To come in here and achieve one of my goals that I have had since I was a little kid is so exciting. I am very happy to have this gold medal around my neck." In event finals, she placed fourth on uneven bars scoring 14.500, third on balance beam scoring 15.133, and sixth on floor scoring 14.700.

Wieber was a finalist for the James E. Sullivan Award, which is given annually by the Amateur Athletic Union.

2012 
In January, Wieber appeared on The Ellen DeGeneres Show.

At the beginning of March, Wieber competed at the American Cup in New York City, New York. She won the all-around competition with a score of 61.320. "It feels amazing to win my third American Cup," said Wieber. "I'm really excited to get started with the Olympic year."

Later in March, Wieber competed at the 2012 Pacific Rim Gymnastics Championships in Everett, Washington. She helped the American team place first. Individually, she won the all-around competition with a score of 61.050. Wieber said, "I was pretty happy that I hit four solid events, because it's been a few meets since I've (done that)." In the event finals, she placed sixth on balance beam scoring 13.700 and first on floor scoring 15.125.

In May, Wieber competed at the Secret U.S. Classic in Chicago, Illinois. She placed 8th on uneven bars with a score of 14.250 and first on balance beam with a score of 15.000.

In June, Wieber competed at the Visa Championships in St. Louis, Missouri. She won the all-around competition with a two-day combined score of 121.900. In the event finals, she placed fifth on uneven bars scoring 30.100, fifth on balance beam scoring 29.750, and second on floor scoring 30.500. "I'm just happy to be here, especially in the Olympic year," Wieber said. "I feel like all my hard work is paying off."

In early July, Wieber competed at the Olympic Trials in San Jose, California. After the first day, Wieber said, "Today went pretty well. My main goal was to go out there and do confident routines. The crowd was awesome – I love seeing the stands full and hearing them cheer before I go up for a routine." She placed second in the all-around competition with a two-day combined score of 123.350. In the event finals, she placed fourth on uneven bars scoring 30.700, third on balance beam scoring 29.950, and second on floor scoring 31.000. Wieber was chosen as a member of the American team for the 2012 Summer Olympics. "It feels amazing to be an Olympian," Wieber said. "This is definitely the best day of my life and knowing that all of my hard work has paid off is amazing. I'm just so proud of each and every girl who competed here today."

Wieber was featured on the cover of Sports Illustrated with the rest of the USA Women's Olympic Gymnastics team on the July 18, 2012, issue of Olympic Preview. This marked the first time an entire Olympic gymnastics team had been featured on the cover of "Sports Illustrated".

London Olympics 

At the end of July, Wieber competed at the 2012 Summer Olympics in London, United Kingdom.  In qualifications, she placed fourth overall with a score of 60.032 behind teammates Aly Raisman and Gabby Douglas, meaning that she would not advance to the all-around final due to the rule limiting participating countries to having a maximum of two competitors in the all-around final. Wieber would still compete in the team final where the American team qualified first and the floor final where she qualified sixth with a score of 14.666. She said, "It was hard because of course I wanted that spot, but I also wanted Aly to do her best also for the team and for herself. It's always been a dream of mine to compete in the all around at the Olympics and shoot for that gold medal. I'm really proud of Aly and Gabby both and I'm happy that they both made it to the all around and I'm glad that I'll be able to help the team out in team finals."  Her coach, John Geddert said, "I'm basically devastated for her. She has trained her entire life for this day and to have it turn out anything less than she deserves is going to be devastating. She has waited her entire career for this. She is happy for her teammates and disappointed that she doesn't get to move on."

In the team final, Wieber contributed scores of 15.933 on vault, 14.666 on uneven bars, and 15.000 on floor toward the American team's first-place finish.  Wieber is considered to be a confident and steady "lead off" gymnast.  She "set the table" for the rest of the American team during finals, posting consistent scores. Wieber said, "I was pretty disappointed, but I had to put it together mentally, especially for this team. A team gold medal was also officially a goal of mine, and I had to pull myself together and move on and be stronger mentally for the team. The feeling was incredible. To have this gold medal around your neck, it's really an indescribable feeling." The team was nicknamed the "Fierce Five".

In the floor final, Wieber placed seventh with a score of 14.500 after going out of bounds on her second tumbling pass (her score from the team final would've been enough to win the bronze medal).
She said, "I knew that it was going to have to take a lot of details in the routine with all the landings. I did step out of bounds, and I knew at that point that it wouldn't be enough. I tried to still fight through and finish the routine strong."

After the Olympics, Wieber announced that she had been competing with a stress fracture in her right leg caused by a heel injury.  She said, "Once I got out on the floor, adrenaline took over and I didn't really feel it that much."  She was forced to limit her training to protect the injury.  "That affected me a little bit," Wieber said.  "I know that eventually affected my performance. In the end, I have no regrets. I know injuries come with the sport and you have to deal with it and I'm glad I fought through and finished out to the end."

Post-Olympics

In 2013, Wieber signed a sponsorship agreement with Adidas Gymnastics. In the fall, she enrolled as a freshman at UCLA, where she studied psychology. She was also a Team Manager for their gymnastics team during her first three years and served as volunteer assistant coach her senior year.

On March 6, 2015, Wieber announced her retirement from elite gymnastics. Wieber was the first member of the Fierce Five to retire from elite gymnastics.

Selected competitive skills

Coaching career

UCLA: 2016–2019 
During her senior year of college, Wieber became a volunteer assistant coach at UCLA for the 2016–17 season. She continued this role after graduation, throughout the 2017–18 and 2018–19 seasons. She served as the floor exercise coach for the Bruins, helping them finish the 2018 and 2019 regular seasons ranked number 1 on the event. She, along with fellow UCLA assistant coaches Chris Waller and Randy Lane, won the West Region Assistant Coaches of the Year award for 2018.

Arkansas: 2019–present 
On April 24, 2019, Wieber became the head coach for the Arkansas Razorbacks gymnastics program, the first Olympic champion gymnast to take the helm of a collegiate women's gymnastics program. She succeeded long-time head coach Mark Cook.

Personal life 
Wieber has been dating 2016 Olympian Chris Brooks since 2017.  She announced their engagement on October 5, 2021.

On January 19, 2018, Wieber testified in court that she was sexually abused by the long-term team doctor of USA Gymnastics, Larry Nassar. On May 16, it was announced that Wieber and the other survivors would be awarded the Arthur Ashe Courage Award.

Competitive history

References

External links 
 
 
 
 
 
 
 

1995 births
Living people
American female artistic gymnasts
American people of Lebanese descent
College women's gymnastics coaches in the United States
Gymnasts at the 2012 Summer Olympics
Medalists at the 2012 Summer Olympics
Medalists at the World Artistic Gymnastics Championships
Olympic gold medalists for the United States in gymnastics
People from DeWitt, Michigan
Sportspeople from Michigan
World champion gymnasts
Catholics from Michigan
U.S. women's national team gymnasts
Sportspeople of Lebanese descent
21st-century American women